New Vernon is an unincorporated community located within Harding Township in Morris County, New Jersey, United States. The community is within the boundaries of Harding Township along with a portion of Green Village. It is the location of the governmental offices for Harding Township. The area is served as United States Postal Service ZIP code 07976 which is identified as being New Vernon.

As of the 2010 United States Census, the population for Zip Code Tabulation Area 07976 was 754.

Forbes magazine ranked New Vernon, New Jersey — ZIP code 07976 — as one of the 25 most "expensive" zip codes in the country.

History
Abraham Canfield moved here  and established a country store, blacksmith shop, and cider mill. The community was first called New Vernon in a newspaper printed in 1808 at Morristown. The New Vernon Presbyterian Church was established in 1833.

Historic district

The New Vernon Historic District is a  historic district located along Lee's Hill, Village, Mill Brook and Glen Alpin Roads in the community. It was added to the National Register of Historic Places on July 8, 1982, for its significance in architecture and exploration/settlement. The district has 24 contributing buildings. The First Presbyterian Church of New Vernon was built in 1833 and features Federal and Gothic Revival styles. The church manse is a brick house built in the 1930s with Tudor architecture. The church education building is also built of brick and features a tower and spire. The contributing Tunis–Ellicks House is home to the Harding Township Historical Society.

Demographics

Notable people

People who were born in, residents of, or otherwise closely associated with New Vernon include:

 William O. Baker (1915–2005), chairman of Bell Laboratories.
 Steve Conine (born 1972/73), co-founder of the online retailer Wayfair.
 Geraldine Rockefeller Dodge (1882–1973), philanthropist, the first woman invited to judge for the Westminster Kennel Club, a founder of the Seeing Eye Foundation, Saint Hubert's at Giralda, and the Morris and Essex Dog Club; daughter of William Avery Rockefeller, Jr.
 Marcellus Hartley Dodge, Sr. (1881–1963), philanthropist, chairman of Remington Arms Company, president of the Y.M.C.A., and the founder of the Spring Valley Hounds and its horse show; grandson of William E. Dodge Sr. a founder of Phelps, Dodge, and Company, a United States congressman (1866–67), and founding member of YMCA in the United States.
 Justin Gimelstob (born 1977), professional tennis player.
 Kerry Kittles (born 1974), guard for the New Jersey Nets from 1996 to 2004.
 Eric Mangini (born 1971), head coach of the New York Jets from 2005 to 2008.
 Morgan Pearson (born 1993), professional triathlete who won a silver medal in the mixed relay event at the 2020 Summer Olympics.
 Bo Sullivan (1937-2000), chairman of the New Jersey Turnpike Authority and a Republican Party politician who sought the nomination for Governor of New Jersey in the 1981 primary.
 Frederick T. van Beuren Jr. (1875–1943), physician and surgeon, who served as a hospital and medical school administrator.

See also
 National Register of Historic Places listings in Morris County, New Jersey

References

External links
 

Harding Township, New Jersey
Unincorporated communities in Morris County, New Jersey
Unincorporated communities in New Jersey